Jamie A. Korab, ONL (born November 28, 1979 in Harbour Grace, Newfoundland) is a Canadian curler and politician. Korab was the lead for the gold medal-winning Canadian men's team at the 2006 Winter Olympics skipped by Brad Gushue. In the 2017 Newfoundland and Labrador municipal elections, Korab was elected to St. John's City Council representing Ward 3.

Career
Korab played in two Canadian Junior Curling Championships and three Briers before playing at the Olympics.

At the 1997 Canadian Juniors, he played as a third for Randy Turpin. At the 2000 Canadian Juniors, he joined up Gushue as his second and they went all the way to the junior finals that year, losing to British Columbia's Brad Kuhn in the final. It was his last year as juniors, so he had to leave the team, but rejoined them for the 2003 Nokia Brier. He would play as Gushue's second once again at the 2004 Nokia Brier and moved back to his lead at the 2005 Tim Hortons Brier.  In 2005, the team added two-time world champion Russ Howard at second, which gave them a victory at the Canadian Olympic trials and a berth to the 2006 Olympic Games, where they won the gold medal, defeating Finland's Markku Uusipaavalniemi 10–4 in the final.

On April 5, 2007, it was officially announced that Korab was cut from the Gushue rink during a team meeting the night before.  The move was said to be due to a team chemistry issue and not reflective of his curling ability.  According to an interview aired on NTV news on April 5, 2007, there is speculation on Korab's part that the move may have been at least somewhat motivated by a verbal exchange between Korab and skip Brad Gushue some time before. It is also possible there was an issue between Korab and Chris Schille, the team's new second as of the beginning of the 2006–07 season.

For the 2007–08 curling season, Korab played second on a team consisting of Olympic teammate Mike Adam, Ryan LeDrew and Mark Noseworthy.

In April 2008, Brad Gushue announced that Korab would once again be a part of his team for the 2008–09 curling season. In 2010, after two seasons with Gushue, winning a Grand Slam of Curling and finishing a disappointing 4th at the 2009 & 2010 Briers, Korab decided to take some time off from curling. He helped to coach Heather Strong's rink from St. John's from the 2010–13 season. The team won the NL provincials and participated in the 2012 Scotties Tournament of Hearts in Red Deer. Korab's wife (Stephanie) was also on that team.

Korab was brought on to be Gushue's alternate at the 2013 Tim Hortons Brier and the 2014 Tim Hortons Brier.

Politics
In 2013, Korab ran for the  Liberal Party of Newfoundland and Labrador's nomination in the riding of Carbonear-Harbour Grace for a by-election held there. Before the by-election was held, Korab withdrew from the race.

In 2017, Korab announced his intention to run in the St. John's municipal election to represent Ward 3 of the city on the St. John's City Council. He was easily elected, winning 63% of the vote. He was re-elected in 2021, with 47% of the vote.

Personal life
Korab attended St. Francis High School. He is currently a Real Estate Agent with RE/MAX in St. John's.

Korab is married to Stephanie Korab, and the couple had their first child in 2013. It was the birth of his child that motivated Korab to step back from full-time professional curling in order to spend more time with family.

Korab is involved with many charities and currently sits on the board of directors for Kids Eat Smart.

Awards
 Brier: Second Team All-Star, Second – 2004

References

External links
 

Curlers from Newfoundland and Labrador
Curlers at the 2006 Winter Olympics
Living people
Members of the Order of Newfoundland and Labrador
1979 births
People from Harbour Grace
Olympic gold medalists for Canada
Olympic curlers of Canada
Olympic medalists in curling
Medalists at the 2006 Winter Olympics
Canadian sportsperson-politicians
Canadian male curlers
Continental Cup of Curling participants
St. John's, Newfoundland and Labrador city councillors
Sportspeople from St. John's, Newfoundland and Labrador
Canada Cup (curling) participants